The northern woolly horseshoe bat (Rhinolophus perniger) is a bat species of the family Rhinolophidae. It is found in the Indian Subcontinent, Southeast Asia, and China.

References

Rhinolophidae
Mammals described in 1843
Bats of China
Mammals of India
Mammals of Nepal
Mammals of Bangladesh
Mammals of Cambodia
Mammals of China
Mammals of Vietnam
Mammals of Laos
Mammals of Myanmar
Mammals of Thailand
Bats of Southeast Asia
Taxa named by Brian Houghton Hodgson